Destroy What You Enjoy is the fifth studio album by American rock band Powerman 5000, released on August 1, 2006, via DRT Records. It includes the single "Wild World", which was voted No. 3 on Headbangers Ball's top videos poll of 2006, while the album itself was voted by Metal Edge as one of the "Top 10 Albums of 2006". The album debuted at No. 120 on the Billboard 200 chart and sold 7,000 copies in its first week of release.

Reception
Destroy What You Enjoy received mixed reactions and reviews upon release. It had also received mostly negative reactions among the fanbase, due to the band's change in the music, shifting more towards the punk rock genre.

Track listing

Credits

Powerman 5000
 Spider One – lead vocals
Johnny Heatley – lead guitar, backing vocals
Terry Corso – rhythm guitar
Siggy Sjursen – bass guitar
Adrian Ost – drums, backing vocals

Other personnel
Scott Gilman – organ (Hammond)
Jon Heintz – mastering
Myriam Santos-Kayda – photography
David Schiffman – mixing

Chart positions
Album – Billboard (North America)

References

Powerman 5000 albums
2006 albums